The Health Physics Society (HPS) is a nonprofit scientific professional organization whose mission is excellence in the science and practice of radiation safety.  It is based in the United States and the specific purposes of the society's activities include encouraging research in radiation science, developing standards, and disseminating radiation safety information. Society members are involved in understanding, evaluating, and controlling potential risks from radiation relative to the benefits.

The Society was formed in 1955, with an organizational meeting in June, 1955 at Ohio State University Columbus, Ohio. As of 2013, the membership consists of approximately 5,500 scientists, physicians, engineers,  and other professionals. The society is an affiliate of the American Institute of Physics.

Activities 
It publishes Health Physics since 1958, a peer-reviewed scientific journal; Health Physics News for material of interest to members,  and Operational Radiation Safety. It operates a public information website, "Radiation Answers", and has begun a series of special publications (The first, Radiation and Risk: Expert Perspectives was published in March 2012.)

It holds its annual meeting in July, and a mid-year meeting in January or February.

The society's archives are held at the University of Tennessee, Knoxville.

Organization

The society has 37 geographically based chapters, all in the United States, except for one chapter in the Georgian Republic and one in Taiwan; there are 8 Sections on special interests.

Awards
Robley D. Evans Commemorative Medal
Distinguished Scientific Achievement Award
Elda E. Anderson Award
Founders Award
Fellow Award
Distinguished Public Service Award
Geoffrey G. Eichholz Outstanding Science Teacher Award
National Student Science Award
Health Physics Honor Roll
G. William Morgan Lectureship Award
Robert S. Landauer Sr., Lectureship Award
Dade Moeller Lectureship Award

Meetings
The first annual meeting was held in 1956 at the University of Michigan and these meetings have been held every year since in different US cities.

History
A new national scientific organization for health physicists was founded at a 3-day health physics conference at Ohio State University on 14 June 1955. The organization was temporarily named "Health Physics Society", and Karl Z. Morgan of the Health Physics Division of Oak Ridge National Laboratory was elected interim president. Other interim officers were Frederick P. Cowan (vice president) and Elda E. Anderson (secretary-treasurer).

See also
American Academy of Health Physics, open only to those certified by the American Board of Health Physics.

References

External links

 Radiation Answers, an information web site for the general public operated by the society
American Institute of Physics

 
Organizations established in 1955
Physics organizations
1955 establishments in Ohio
Radiation protection